Luy Lâu (Vietnamese) or Leilou    (< Middle Chinese ZS *liuᴇ-ləu < Eastern Han Chinese *lyai-lo) was the first capital of the Han commandery of Jiaozhi from 111 BC following China's conquest of Nanyue/Nam Viet till 106 BC. It was also the headquarters of the larger province of Jiaozhou and the center of China's maritime trade on the Gulf of Tonkin and South China Sea.

Luy Lâu became a major center for Buddhism in Vietnam. Although the Roman embassies probably arrived at the later capital Long Biên, it may have been the earlier Luy Lâu that was the origin of Ptolemy's Cattigara.

See also
 List of capitals of Vietnam
 Long Biên

References

History of Bắc Ninh Province